Pedro Zaballa Barquín (29 July 1938 – 4 June 1997) was a Spanish footballer who played for FC Barcelona between 1961 and 1967, and scored the 2000th goal for Barcelona in La Liga.

He played for CE Sabadell since 1967 until 1970 and scored the first European goal of the club.

International goals

Honours
Barcelona
Inter-Cities Fairs Cup: 1965–66
Spanish Cup: 1962–63

External links
 
 National team data 
 

1938 births
1997 deaths
People from Castro Urdiales
Spanish footballers
Footballers from Cantabria
Association football forwards
La Liga players
Gimnástica de Torrelavega footballers
Rayo Cantabria players
Racing de Santander players
FC Barcelona players
CE Sabadell FC footballers
Real Oviedo players
Spain B international footballers
Spain international footballers